Southeast Idaho National Wildlife Refuge Complex is a National Wildlife Refuge complex in the state of Idaho.

Refuges within the complex
Bear Lake National Wildlife Refuge
Camas National Wildlife Refuge
Grays Lake National Wildlife Refuge
Minidoka National Wildlife Refuge

References
Complex website

National Wildlife Refuges in Idaho